Gary Wright (born 9 November 1970) is an Australian cricketer. He played in one first-class match for South Australia in 1992/93.

See also
 List of South Australian representative cricketers

References

External links
 

1970 births
Living people
Australian cricketers
South Australia cricketers
Cricketers from Adelaide